Sienna Street (Polish: Ulica Sienna, lit. Hay Street) - a historic street in Kraków, Poland. The street extends from the Main Square towards Westerplatte Street.

The street was part of a former trading route between Wieliczka, Tarnów and Lwów. After the junction near the Planty Park, the street extends as Starowiślna Street. Its former name was Zwierzęca Street (Ulica Zwierzęca, lit. Animal Street) due to nearby slaughter houses. The street would also be known as Szkolna Street (Ulica Szkolna, lit. School Street) due to the former existence of a nearby school devoted to the Virgin Mary.

Features

References

Streets in Kraków